Iskra is a rural locality (a selo) in Soloneshensky Selsoviet, Soloneshensky District, Altai Krai, Russia. The population was 156 as of 2013. There are 4 streets.

Geography 
Iskra is located on the Anuy River, 14 km south of Soloneshnoye (the district's administrative centre) by road.

References 

Rural localities in Soloneshensky District